Mehdi Terki (born 27 September 1991) is a professional footballer who plays as a midfielder for Luxembourgish club Swift Hesperange. Born in France, he has represented Algeria at youth level.

Club career
On 10 January 2022, Terki signed with Swift Hesperange in Luxembourg.

International career
Born in France, Terki is of Algerian descent. He was called up to the Algeria U23s.

References

1991 births
People from Maubeuge
Sportspeople from Nord (French department)
Footballers from Hauts-de-France
Living people
Association football midfielders
Algerian footballers
French footballers
French sportspeople of Algerian descent
R.A.E.C. Mons players
K.A.A. Gent players
CS Constantine players
K.S.C. Lokeren Oost-Vlaanderen players
Xanthi F.C. players
RWDM47 players
FC Swift Hesperange players
Belgian Pro League players
Super League Greece players
Challenger Pro League players
Algerian expatriate footballers
French expatriate footballers
Expatriate footballers in Belgium
Algerian expatriate sportspeople in Belgium
French expatriate sportspeople in Belgium
Expatriate footballers in Greece
Algerian expatriate sportspeople in Greece
French expatriate sportspeople in Greece
Expatriate footballers in Luxembourg
Algerian expatriate sportspeople in Luxembourg
French expatriate sportspeople in Luxembourg